The Chiefs is a Philippine television current affairs talk show broadcast by One News, hosted by News5 chief correspondent Ed Lingao, News5 chief Luchi Cruz-Valdes, BusinessWorld editor-in-chief emeritus Roby Alampay, and Philippine Star editor-in-chief Amy Pamintuan.

It premiered on May 28, 2018. It airs every weeknight at 8:30 PM (PST). The show also aired on TV5 from August 26, 2019, to July 17, 2020, and returned on March 13, 2022, replacing M Countdown and returned again on January 22, 2023.

Hosts
 Ed Lingao
 Roby Alampay
 Amy Pamintuan
 Luchi Cruz-Valdes

See also
 One News

References

One News (TV channel) original programming
TV5 (Philippine TV network) news shows
Philippine television talk shows
2018 Philippine television series debuts
English-language television shows